Aphotaenius is a genus of aphodiine dung beetles in the family Scarabaeidae. There are about five described species in Aphotaenius.

Species
These five species belong to the genus Aphotaenius:
 Aphotaenius cambeforti Chalumeau, 1983
 Aphotaenius carolinus (Van Dyke, 1928)
 Aphotaenius convexus (Harold, 1880)
 Aphotaenius howdeni Cartwright, 1963
 Aphotaenius plaumanni Cartwright, 1963

References

Further reading

 
 
 

Scarabaeidae genera
Articles created by Qbugbot